Sirens of the Ditch is the debut solo album released by singer-songwriter and former Drive-By Truckers lead guitarist, Jason Isbell. The album was released on July 10, 2007.

After leaving Drive-By Truckers amicably in 2007, Isbell released Sirens of the Ditch on New West Records. Sirens of the Ditch was recorded at FAME Studios, where among the musicians helping to record the album was Patterson Hood of Drive by Truckers and Spooner Oldham, famous for his work with Aretha Franklin and Neil Young. According to Washington Post writer Catherine Lewis, Sirens of the Ditch has "a more bluesy pop sound" than Isbell's work with Drive-By Truckers. The first single from the album, "Brand New Kind of Actress," deals with the death of Lana Clarkson in Phil Spector's mansion. Another single, "Dress Blues," concerns the death of Corporal Matthew Conley, a US Marine from Isbell's hometown who was killed in the Iraq War.  "Dress Blues" was also recorded by the Zac Brown Band (featuring Jewel), on their April 2015 release, Jekyll + Hyde.

The album was re-released on July 13, 2018. Titled Sirens of the Ditch: Deluxe Edition, the album features four previously unreleased songs.

Track listing

Personnel
 David Barbe – keyboards
 Mike Dillon – drums
 David Hood – bass guitar
 Patterson Hood – acoustic guitar, electric guitar
 Jason Isbell – banjo, bass guitar, dobro, acoustic guitar, electric guitar, Hammond organ, piano, lead vocals, background vocals, Wurlitzer
 Clay Leverett – background vocals
 Brad Morgan – drums
 John Neff – pedal steel guitar
 Spooner Oldham – Hammond organ
 Shonna Tucker – bass guitar, background vocals

References

2007 debut albums
Jason Isbell albums
New West Records albums